Gilbert Friedell Rozman (born 18 February 1943) is an American sociologist specializing in Asian studies.

Rozman completed an undergraduate degree in Chinese and Russian studies at Carleton College, and earned a doctorate in sociology at Princeton University. He was a Princeton faculty member between 1970 and 2013, where he taught as Musgrave Professor of Sociology.

Selected publications

References

1943 births
Living people
Princeton University faculty
Princeton University alumni
Carleton College alumni
American orientalists
American sociologists
20th-century social scientists
21st-century social scientists